Help is the debut studio album by gospel musician Erica Campbell, originally released on March 25, 2014 by eOne. This is Erica Campbell's debut studio album without her sister Tina Campbell. The album's release was preceded by the singles "A Little More Jesus", the title track "Help" and "You Are". The album debuted at number 1 on the US Billboard Gospel Albums chart and number 6 on the Billboard 200 with first-week sales of 23,000 copies. The album also won the Grammy Award for Best Gospel Album at the 57th Grammy Awards.

Background
This album was released on March 25, 2014. The release marks the first solo studio album apart from her duo of Mary Mary, which was produced by her husband Warryn Campbell and released under the eOne record label.

Critical reception

Help garnered praise from four music critics ratings and reviews. At Los Angeles Times, Mikael Wood rated the album three out of four stars, stating that on the release "Campbell is always open to more feeling." David Jeffries of AllMusic rated the album three-and-a-half stars out of five, writing that the release "is a return to more traditional themes like prayer, creation, and the struggles of everyday life, while traditional gospel plays more of a role than the usual R&B, thus allowing Erica to show off her vocal talents." At CCM Magazine, Andrew Greer rated the album a perfect five stars, saying that the release "is set to enamor urban music history". Dwayne Lacy of New Release Tuesday rated the album four-and-a-half stars out of five, remarking that the release "was a very good debut offering" on which the production was "nothing short of masterful." In a nine squares review by Cross Rhythms, Stephen Luff believes the music on the album creates a "top debut solo album with the potential for more radio friendly songs" in the near future.

Commercial performance
For the Billboard charting week of April 12, 2014, Help was the No. 6 most sold album in the entirety of the United States by the Billboard 200, and it was the No. 2 Independent Album sold the same week. In addition, the album was the No. 1 most sold Top Gospel Albums.

Track listing
Unless otherwise indicated, Credits are adapted from liner notes.

Personnel

Erica Campbell - Primary Artist, Vocals (tracks 1, 5, 7, 11; Lead on 2-4, 8-10, 12-13), Handclaps (3) & Background Vocals (2-4, 8, 13)
Warryn Campbell - Executive Producer, Musical Arrangements (tracks 1-4, 7-11), Banjo (13), Handclaps (3), Drums (3, 5), Fender Rhodes (3), Bass Guitar (3), Electric Guitar (8; Additional on 2), Instruments (9-10, 12; All Other on 1, 11; Additional on 7, 13), Keyboards (2, 8; Additional on 5), Percussion (2, 5, 8), Ukulele (13) & Background Vocals (2-4, 8, 13)
Krista Campbell - Dialogue (track 6) & Background Vocals (4)
Tina Campbell - Background Vocals (track 3)
Teddy Campbell - Drums (tracks 2, 8)
The Atkins Girls (Erica, Tina, Thomasina, Alana & Shanta) - Vocals sung by (track 6)
Thomasina 'Goo Goo' Atkins - Wardrobe & Background Vocals 
Alana Atkins-Jamison - Background Vocals 
Shanta Atkins - Background Vocals (tracks 2, 8)
Honey Atkins - Piano (track 6)
Aaron Lindsey - Organ (track 3)
Chris "#9" Payton - Banjo (track 8), Acoustic Guitar (1-3, 5, 8, 13), Electric Guitar Soloist (2) & Background Vocals (3)
Derek Blanks - Art Direction, Design & Photography
Dontae Winslow - Horns (tracks 2, 11)
Gerald Haddon - Piano (track 5)
Gromyko Collins - Background Vocals (track 4)
TRiON (Augie Ray & Jintae Ko) - Additional Instruments played & programmed by (tracks 9-10)

Jamar Jones - String Arrangements (track 4)
James Cruz - Mastering
Jason McGee - Background Vocals (tracks 4, 8)
Larry Whitt - Recording Engineer (All Tracks)
Lecrae - Featured Artist, Rap Vocals performed by (track 4)
Major Johnson - Dialogue (track 6)
Marvin Winans Jr - Handclaps (track 3) & Background Vocals (2, 8)
Monique Winans - Handclaps (track 3)
Musiq Soulchild - Background Vocals (track 4)
Pat Berginson - Harmonica (track 3)
Psalms - Background Vocals (tracks 4, 8)
Rob Chiarelli - Audio Mixing (All Tracks)
Rodney Jones Jr. - Bass played by (tracks 2, 7-8, 11)
Sean Cooper - Talk Box (track 10)
Tammi Haddon - Ukulele (track 5)
Terrell Mullin - Hair Stylist & Make-Up
The Family and Friends Chorale - Background Vocals (tracks 9, 12)

Chart performance

References

2014 debut albums
Erica Campbell albums
Grammy Award for Best Gospel Album